

Federal
Elections for Federal offices, as in the rest of the country, occurred on November 2. The Primaries were held on August 28 with a runoff for the Republican U.S. House nomination occurring on October 2 in Louisiana's 3rd congressional district (no other primaries went to a runoff).

United States Congress
Louisiana's Class III U.S. Senate seat and all seven U.S. House seats were up for election.

United States Senate

Senator David Vitter (R) sought re-election. Vitter overcame intraparty opposition in the August primary and was opposed in the General election by U.S. Representative Charlie Melancon (D).

United States House of Representatives

Six of the seven members of Louisiana's House delegation sought re-election. Both before and after the elections, Republicans held six of Louisiana's U.S. House seats while Democrats held one seat, but the lone Democratic seat changed from the Louisiana's 2nd congressional district to the 3rd. Many political prognosticators regarded the races in the Second and Third districts as the most competitive.

State
The State of Louisiana usually holds its general elections for state offices in post-midterm off-years. Elections for state and local offices, unlike federal elections, are conducted under the jungle primary (also known as nonpartisan blanket primary) format and are usually held in mid-October.

State Executive Officers
Besides various local elections and special elections legislative seats and other positions, ballots in Louisiana during 2010 concerned a special election for lieutenant governor, for the judiciary, and for certain referendums (including amendments to the state constitution) and other measures.

Lieutenant Governor
Lt. Governor Mitch Landrieu's (D) election as Mayor of New Orleans created a vacancy, thus necessitating a special election. Scott Angelle (D) was appointed by Governor Bobby Jindal (R) in May to fill the vacancy until the conclusion of the special election. Angelle agreed to do the job only until it was filled via the special election for the remainder of the term to which Landrieu had been elected; thus Angelle did not qualify for that election.

The special election cycle began with the 2010 October 2 jungle primary, which pitted Republicans Jay Dardenne, Kevin Davis, Sammy Kershaw, Melanie J. McKnight, and Roger Villere and Democrats James "Jim" Crowley, Caroline Fayard, and Butch Gautreaux. Dardenne and Fayard advanced to the general election.

Throughout the campaign leading up to the primary election, Villere had been especially critical of Dardenne. Thus Villere's subsequent endorsement of Dardenne was met with incredulous statements like those of political scientist Pearson Cross of the University of Louisiana at Lafayette:
Maybe he thinks that you can at the end of the day say, "Well, we just need to all come together." It just seems odd.

Subsequently, Louisiana Republican Party officials declined to give state party funds to Dardenne's campaign, even as the Louisiana Democratic Party paid $209,936 for a television commercial as an "in-kind donation" supporting Fayard. The Louisiana Republican Party continued to ignore Dardenne's campaign even as the Louisiana Democratic Party raised its support of Fayard to $423,000. Between the primary and the general election Fayard exceeded Dardenne in both fundraising and spending, a situation fostered significantly by the Louisiana Democratic Party's donations in support of Fayard while the Louisiana Republican Party declined to open its pursestrings for Dardenne. Ultimately the Louisiana Democratic Party spent $770,000 on Fayard's campaign. Louisiana's Republican governor Bobby Jindal also declined to involve himself in either the election for lieutenant governor or the election for U.S. Senator between Republican incumbent David Vitter and the challenging Democrat, U.S. Representative Charlie Melancon.
 
Among other discussions, Dardenne and Fayard appeared on the October 15 Louisiana: The State We're In magazine televised by Louisiana Public Broadcasting and on an October 22 forum sponsored by the Baton Rouge League of Women Voters.

The runoff campaigns for the general election on November 2 between Dardenne and Fayard, soon turned vitriolic, with Dardenne describing Fayard as a supporter of U.S. President Barack Obama and same-sex marriage and an opponent of the death penalty, while Fayard, who was 32 years of age and had never held political office, attempted to deflect the Republican tide by claiming that Dardenne represented the legacy of Louisiana politics. Times-Picayune columnist Stephanie Grace opined that 
Washington-style partisanship so dominates the mood this season that it's even bleeding into the contest for lieutenant governor.

Besides contributions to Clinton, Kerry, former state senator Cleo Fields, and former U.S. Representative William J. Jefferson, a Dardenne commercial criticized Fayard's previous employment by Goldman Sachs, which later received a federal bailout: "Analysts like Fayard got rich but cost us billions." Fayard countered: We have been hit hard by hurricanes, and BP and the moratorium. Our people are tired of being ignored." Fayard's commercial ended with an assertion that Fayard, merely somewhat more than half Dardenne's age, was not part of "the same old crowd" of Louisiana politics. Fayard came after Dardenne for "earning outside income" by maintaining a law practice, which Dardenne said was only for "some limited legal work for longtime clients and some mediation work, but not on state time." When Fayard pledged to spend "110 percent" of her time as lieutenant governor, Dardenne called Fayard's pledge "a cheap political stunt."

In the October 22 forum sponsored by the Baton Rouge League of Women Voters, Fayard continued to knock Dardenne's outside income, and Dardenne responded that Fayard had voted in just seven of the previous 14 elections. In response to Dardenne's question on where the money came from when she lent her campaign over $400,000 but had indicated her 2009 income as less than $80,000, Fayard responded that she had followed "every ethical rule" and that the money came from "success."

Television commercials by the two candidates intensified in number and acrimony during the week before the runoff. A Darden commercial criticized Fayard's assigning, in response to a forum question, a grade of "B+" to President Barack Obama's performance while "F" was the grade assigned by Dardenne.

Dardenne won the November 2 election. Darden's elevation to lieutenant governor was delayed formally and officially to 2010 November 22 to obviate a statutory requirement to hold a special election to fill the position of secretary of state. Thus on November 22 Darden's chief deputy Tom Schedler became secretary of state.

In the backdrop of Dardenne's high name recognition and established reputation and the uphill battle many Democrats were facing around the country in the 2010 elections, the Think Tank with Garland Robinette talk radio program speculated that Fayard, as a savvy candidate, had little or nothing to lose in the lieutenant governor race and that she might prove to be the most effective candidate the Louisiana Democratic Party could offer in 2011 as an alternative to Republican governor Bobby Jindal. The discussion cited Jindal's high approval ratings and already in-the-bank $7 million campaign fund as unapproachable assets for Democrats other than Fayard. Fayard did not run, and the leading Democrat in the 2011 race was Tara Hollis of Thibodaux with 17% of the vote.

Results

Judiciary
The Louisiana judicial elections of 2010 consisted of multiple dates. There were elections on February 6 (for one Louisiana District Courts seat), March 27 (three District Court seats), August 28, 2010 (political primary, no judges on ballot), and October 2 (in which one Louisiana Supreme Court seat and thirteen Louisiana Courts of Appeal seats were up for election). Judicial elections in Louisiana are conducted with the political party affiliation of the candidate indicated on the ballot.

Ballot measures
Numerous measures were on the ballots on October 2 and November 2.

References

External links

 
Louisiana